Gibborissoa is a genus of sea snails, marine gastropod mollusks in the family Litiopidae.

Species
Species within the genus Gibborissoa include:

 Gibborissoa mirabilis (Philippi, 1849)
 Gibborissoa virgata

References

External links

Litiopidae